Several schools share the name Ballard High School or a similar name including:

Ballard High School in Macon, Georgia that was eventually merged to form Ballard-Hudson High School
Ballard High School (Huxley, Iowa), a school in the Ballard Community School District in Huxley, Iowa
Ballard Memorial High School, Barlow, Kentucky
Ballard High School (Louisville, Kentucky)
Ballard High School (Butler, Missouri), Butler, Missouri
Ballard High School (Seattle, Washington)